Joey's Case is a crime novel by the American writer K. C. Constantine set in 1980s Rocksburg, a fictional, blue-collar, Rust Belt town in Western Pennsylvania, modeled on the author's hometown of McKees Rocks, Pennsylvania, adjacent to Pittsburgh.

Mario Balzic is the protagonist, an atypical detective for the genre, a Serbo-Italian American cop, middle-aged, unpretentious, a family man who asks questions and uses more sense than force.

The novel opens with a former coal miner, Albert Castelucci, asking Balzic to investigate the killing of his son. He feels the state police in charge of the case have botched the investigation, but when Balzic begins, he finds more puzzles than he first expected.

It is the eighth book in the 17-volume Rocksburg series and was nominated for an Edgar Award.

1988 American novels
Novels by K. C. Constantine
American crime novels
Novels set in Pennsylvania
Mysterious Press books